Komborodougou is a town in northern Ivory Coast. It is a sub-prefecture and commune of Korhogo Department in Poro Region, Savanes District. The border of Vallée du Bandama District is six kilometres east of the town.

In 2014, the population of the sub-prefecture of Komborodougou was 12,947.

Villages
The 43 villages of the sub-prefecture of Komborodougou and their population in 2014 are:

Notes

Sub-prefectures of Poro Region
Communes of Poro Region